Moinabad is a village in Ranga Reddy district of the Indian state of Telangana. It falls under Moinabad mandal of Chevella revenue division.

History 
The name Moinabad originally came from a noble man of Hyderabad State member of the House of Paigah Nawab Moin-Ud-Dowlah Bahadur Asman Jah and the place was in complete control of the nobleman until the independence and mergence of Hyderabad state into India, Before the re-organization of districts, the village was under the jurisdiction of Chevella revenue division and in Ranga Reddy district.

Geography 

Government and politics 
Moinabad gram panchayat is the local self-government of the village. The panchayat is divided into wards and each ward is represented by an elected ward member. The ward members are headed by a Sarpanch.

Chevella (SC) (Assembly constituency) of Telangana Legislative Assembly. The present MLA representing the constituency is Kale Yadaiah of TRS]].

Transport 

Education 
The primary and secondary school education is imparted by the government schools such as Mandal Parishad, Mandal Parishad upper primary and Zilla Parishad High Schools.

References 

Villages in Ranga Reddy district